The Colne and Trawden Light Railway Company operated a tramway service in Colne and Trawden between 1903 and 1934.

History

The tramway was authorised by the Colne and Trawden Light Railway Order of 1901. It was built and operated by Greenwood & Batley of Leeds. Nuttal and Co were contractors for the permanent way, and R.W. Blackwell for the overhead wiring.

Construction started on 19 May 1903 when the Mayor of Colne, Alderman Varley, cut the first sod. Services started on the first section on 28 November 1903, and other sections opened in stages until the line reached Zion Chapel on Lane House Lane, Trawden by December 1905. A branch to Laneshawbridge opened by the end of December 1904. The system connected with Nelson Corporation Tramways.

Colne Corporation purchased the entire system on 24 March 1914 and the name was changed to Colne Corporation Light Railways.

Fleet

The company purchased vehicles as follows:
1-6 G.F. Milnes & Co. 1903
7-9 Brush Electrical Machines, Loughborough 1903
10-12 Milnes Voss, 1906
13 United Electric Car Company 1914
14-16 Brush Electrical Machines, Loughborough 1926

Closure

The system closed on 6 January 1934. It was estimated that the tramcars had travelled over 4,582,000 miles and carried 57.5 million passengers during the years of operation.

References

Tram transport in England
Colne
Transport in the Borough of Pendle
Historic transport in Lancashire
4 ft gauge railways in England